"Dead Tooth" is the second episode of the first season of the Fox sitcom Raising Hope. The episode was written by series creator, Greg Garcia and directed by Michael Fresco. The episode premiered September 28, 2010, on the Fox Broadcasting Company.

In the episode, Jimmy searches for a daycare center for Hope. Through Sabrina, he discovers that Shelley (Kate Micucci), whom he had previously hooked up with, runs a daycare center.

"Dead Tooth" received mixed reviews from critics. According to the Nielsen Media Research, it was watched by 7.09 million viewers.

Plot
When complaints to the police about him bringing Hope to work with him are made, Jimmy realizes he needs a daycare service for her. The Chances go to Sabrina for help and she directs them to her cousin, Shelley (Kate Micucci), whom Jimmy had hooked up with two years previously. In exchange for free daycare service, Shelley dates Jimmy again, but he has to call it off when he realises his feelings for Sabrina.

Reception
In its original American broadcast, "Dead Tooth" was viewed by an estimated 7.09 million viewers with a 3.1 rating/8% share among adults between the ages of 18 and 49.

There was mixed reviews from critics, though multiple praised the performance of Cloris Leachman as Maw Maw. Many also praised the performance of Kate Micucci and Martha Plimpton. "The Voice of TV" ultimately gave the episode a B+.

References

2010 American television episodes
Raising Hope episodes